No Frontiers is an album by Irish singer Mary Black. The album was one of Ireland's best selling albums of 1989 and introduced her to audiences elsewhere in Europe and in the United States and Japan. The album spent 56 weeks in the Irish Top 30.

Track listing
"No Frontiers" (Jimmy MacCarthy) – 3:57
"Past the Point of Rescue" (Mick Hanly) – 6:45
"The Shadow" (Donagh Long) – 5:46
"Carolina Rua" (Thom Moore) – 5:04
"Shuffle of the Buckled" (MacCarthy) – 4:17
"Columbus" (Noel Brazil) – 4:10
"Another Day" (MacCarthy) – 4:34
"Fat Valley of Pain" (Brazil) – 6:20
"I Say a Little Prayer" (Burt Bacharach, Hal David) – 5:34
"Vanities" (Brazil) – 4:38
"The Fog in Monterey" (Moore) – 4:02

Personnel
Mary Black - vocals
Declan Sinnott - guitars, harmony vocals, producer
Pat Crowley - accordion, keyboards, harmony vocals
Garvan Gallagher - double bass, harmony vocals
Noel Bridgeman - percussion, harmony vocals
Carl Geraghty - saxophone
Dónal Lunny - synthesizer (tracks 1, 3, 6, 7)
Caroline Lavelle - cello (tracks 3, 6)
Mandy Murphy - backing vocals (tracks 2, 4, 5, 7, 8, 9, 11)
Tony Davis - backing vocals (tracks 2, 9)
Technical
DanDan FitzGerald - recording and mixing engineer

References

1989 albums
Mary Black albums